The Screen Award for Best Lyricist is a Screen Award chosen by a panel of judges from the Bollywood film industry and the winners are announced in January.

Winners

See also 
 Screen Awards
 Bollywood
 Cinema of India

Screen Awards